The Buildings at 110i112 Inman Street in Cambridge, Massachusetts are part of a series of well-preserved Greek Revival duplexes on Inman Street.  It is a two-story wood-frame structure, with a side gable roof and clapboard siding.  It was built in 1845, and features very straightforward Greek Revival styling, most notably in the corner pilasters and the fully pedimented gable end.  The porch with fluted columns wraps around three sides of the building, differentiating it from the other nearby Greek Revival duplexes.

The buildings were listed on the National Register of Historic Places in 1982.

See also
Building at 102–104 Inman Street
Building at 106–108 Inman Street
National Register of Historic Places listings in Cambridge, Massachusetts

References

Houses on the National Register of Historic Places in Cambridge, Massachusetts
Houses completed in 1845
Greek Revival houses in Massachusetts